Jagath Roshantha (born 20 March 1981) is a Sri Lankan-born cricketer who plays for the Kuwait national cricket team. He played in the 2013 ICC World Cricket League Division Six tournament.

References

External links
 

1981 births
Living people
Kuwaiti cricketers
Sri Lankan emigrants to Kuwait
Sri Lankan expatriate sportspeople in Kuwait
Place of birth missing (living people)
Wicket-keepers